Shella Devi Aulia (born 4 July 1994) is an Indonesian badminton player affiliated with Jaya Raya Jakarta club. She was the silver medalists in girls' and mixed doubles event at the BWF World Junior Championships.

Achievements

ASEAN University Games 

Mixed doubles

BWF World Junior Championships 
Girls' doubles

Mixed doubles

BWF International Challenge/Series (4 titles, 4 runners-up) 
Women's doubles

Mixed doubles

  BWF International Challenge tournament
  BWF International Series tournament

BWF Junior International 

Mixed doubles

  BWF Junior International Grand Prix tournament
  BWF Junior International Challenge tournament
  BWF Junior International Series tournament
  BWF Junior Future Series tournament

Performance timeline

National team 
 Senior level

Individual competitions 
 Junior level

 Senior level

Record against selected opponents 
Mixed doubles results with Hafiz Faizal against World Superseries finalists, World Superseries Finals semifinalists, World Championships semifinalists, and Olympic quarterfinalists.

  Lu Kai & Huang Yaqiong 1–0
  Muhammad Rijal & Vita Marissa 0–2
  Praveen Jordan & Debby Susanto 0–1

References 

1994 births
Living people
People from Bekasi
Sportspeople from West Java
Indonesian female badminton players
Competitors at the 2017 Southeast Asian Games
Southeast Asian Games bronze medalists for Indonesia
Southeast Asian Games medalists in badminton
21st-century Indonesian women
20th-century Indonesian women